The Louisiana Purchase was the acquisition of the Louisiana territory by the United States from France. 

Louisiana Purchase may also refer to:
 Louisiana Purchase (musical), a 1940 musical about Louisiana politics
 Louisiana Purchase (film), a 1941 adaptation of the musical
 Louisiana Purchase, conservatives' name for a deal for Mary Landrieu's support of the Patient Protection and Affordable Care Act

See also
 Louisiana Purchase Exposition, the Saint Louis World's Fair of 1904
 Louisiana Purchase State Park in Arkansas